Lisa Hahner (born 20 November 1989) is a German long distance runner who specialises in the marathon.

Life

She and her twin sister, Anna Hahner, were born in 1989. They were inspired to take up long distance running after hearing an interview with musician and amateur runner Joey Kelly when they were seventeen.

Lisa and Anna competed in the women's marathon event at the 2016 Summer Olympics. Lisa and Anna finished the marathon together but at a time 15 minutes below their personal bests. Thomas Kurschilgen, the German athletics director, criticised their joint (81/82nd) finish publicly, but the picture was valued by the media. They were accused of trying to attract media attention and they did get more coverage than their teammate, Anja Scherl, who finished ahead of them. The twins said that it was Anna's idea. When she realised that with two kilometres to go that she might capture Lisa, then she accelerated to catch her.

References

Enternal links

 

1989 births
Living people
German female long-distance runners
German female marathon runners
Place of birth missing (living people)
Athletes (track and field) at the 2016 Summer Olympics
Olympic athletes of Germany
21st-century German women
20th-century German women